DOVO Solingen, DOVO Steelware, or simply DOVO, is an independent German company, based in Solingen. They are a manufacturer of scissors, shaving equipment such as straight razors and safety razors, as well as manicure tools. Shaving equipment and razors are produced by Merkur Solingen, a subsidiary of DOVO.

DOVO was founded in 1906. The name derives from the last names of the original founders Carl Dorp + Carl Arthur Voos.
Starting from 1950s onwards DOVO has acquired multiple companies like Tennis (1952), Bismarck (1957), "Ankerflagge" (1957), "Teufelskerle" (1968). "Kronpunkt" (1969), Fontana (1970), Heups & Hermes company (1973) and Merkur company (1996).

As of 31 December 2001, the company employed 86 staff, who produced a daily output of 1200 scissors, 900 nippers, and 150 open razors and shavers. 75% of these products were exported to other countries, while the remaining 25% were sold in Germany. Since the early 2000s, the company has seen an increase in demand and as of 2016 produced tens of thousands of razors a year, with 20 employees working exclusively on razors.

Since 2013 DOVO moved towards focusing mainly on their shaving products and introducing new range of straight razors.

Gallery

See also 

Rolls Razor
Safety razor
Timeline of historic inventions
Thiers Issard
Straight razor
Solingen

References

External links

 

Companies based in Solingen
Knife manufacturing companies
German brands
Razor brands
Manufacturing companies of Germany
Manufacturing companies established in 1906
1906 establishments in Germany